Arenda is a given name of the following notable people:
Arenda Grimberg (born 1978), Dutch racing cyclist
Arenda Haasnoot (born 1973), Dutch theologian and preacher
Arenda Troutman (born 1957), American politician
Arenda Wright Allen (born 1960), is a United States District Judge

See also
 1502 Arenda, a minor planet named after the Belgian astronomer Sylvain Arend
Arend (given name)